Donin is a surname. Notable people with this surname include:

 Hayim Halevy Donin (1928–1983), American rabbi and author
 Nicholas Donin, French religious figure

See also
 Denin